Talons of the Eagle is a 1992 American martial arts action film starring Billy Blanks, Jalal Merhi, Matthias Hues and James Hong and directed by Michael Kennedy. It received a limited release on November 6, 1992, and was released on video on December 23, 1992.

Plot summary
After three DEA agents are killed by crime boss Mr. Li (Hong), the DEA reluctantly calls in New York cop and martial arts expert Tyler Wilson (Blanks) and sends him to Toronto, on undercover assignment, to team up with Canadian vice cop Michael Reed (Merhi). Because Tyler and Michael must infiltrate Li's gang, they enter a martial arts tournament that Li is known to attend to recruit talent. Preparing for the tournament, they train with legendary Master Pan Qingfu, who teaches them the art of 'eagle claw'. Pan's son was killed by Li, so he seeks revenge and agrees to teach them.

At the tournament, Tyler and Michael impress Li and end up saving him from being killed by a rival crime boss. Li invites the two to join his staff, therefore granting them access to his operation. While undercover, working as security at Li's illegal gambling facility, they discover that another undercover agent, Cassandra (Priscilla Barnes), has already infiltrated Li's organization. They must, then, verify if she has defected, as she hasn't reported to her commanding officer in three weeks. Michael determines Cassandra hasn't switched sides and the three uncover Li's plot to blackmail a local politician into waiving extradition for one of Li's criminal associates, Fong Wai Hut.

During a drug deal, Michael is arrested, then bailed by Li and brought to interrogation, as Li's right-hand man Khan (Hues) learns Michael is a cop. In the final showdown, Michael escapes and helps Tyler and Pan battle Li, Khan and their army of henchmen, before destroying the entire Li empire.

In the end, the duo are congratulated by their captain and make the sign of the eagle claw.

Cast
 Jalal Merhi as Michael Reed
 Billy Blanks as Tyler Wilson 
 James Hong as Mr. Li 
 Priscilla Barnes as Cassandra
 Pan Qingfu as Master Pan
 Matthias Hues as Khan 
 Harry Mok as Niko
 Gary "Si-Jo" Foo as Fong Wai Hut

Production
The movie was shot in Toronto, Ontario, Canada between April 23, 1992 and May 21, 1992, and was made by production companies Film One Productions and Shapiro-Glickenhaus Entertainment.

Release
It received a short theatrical release in Canada by Cineplex Odeon Films.

Home media
The film was distributed on VHS in 1992 by MCA/Universal Home Video (USA) and that same year by Cineplex-Odeon Home Video and MCA Home Video. Since then it has been distributed by numerous companies on VHS and DVD including a 1999 Home Video release from Alliance Atlantis in Canada and receiving 2 DVD releases. The first DVD was released in the United States by 20th Century Fox in 2004 and in 2005 in Canada by Legacy Entertainment.

Soundtrack
 "Talons of the Eagle" — Written and performed by Jonas J. Patricko
 "Don't Make Me Mad Son" — Written by Ryan Lord and Darren Hill, performed by Top Secret, Dee Rhythm Music
 "Lay Your Money Down" — Written and performed by Britton, lyrics by Murray Plichta

References

Trivia
The film was heavily edited by MTV Brasil in 2007 for the comedic group Hermes & Renato show Tela Class, in which they redubbed and changed the plot from various movies for comedic purposes. Tales of the Eagle became 'Garras de Baitola' (Talons of the Queer), in which the two main characters were implied to be a couple who worked as bouncers in a chinese-owned club. It is implied that Billy Blanks character was Pelé.

External links
 Talons Of The Eagle at Internet Movie Database

American martial arts films
Films directed by Jalal Merhi
Martial arts tournament films